Elias of Dereham (died 1245) was an English master stonemason designer, closely associated with Bishop Jocelin of Wells.

Elias became a Canon of Salisbury, and oversaw the construction of Salisbury Cathedral. He was also responsible for building work at Clarendon Palace.

The chapter house at Salisbury Cathedral displays a copy of Magna Carta. This copy was brought to Salisbury because Elias, who was present at Runnymede in 1215, was to distribute original copies of the document. He died in 1245.

Gallery

References

Further reading
 Nicholas Vincent, Dereham, Elias of (d. 1245), rev., Oxford Dictionary of National Biography, Oxford University Press, 2004. Accessed 21 November 2007.

Year of birth unknown
1246 deaths
English stonemasons
Recipients of English royal pardons